Konchem Ishtam Konchem Kashtam is a 2009 Indian Telugu-language romantic comedy film directed by debutant Kishore Kumar Pardasani. The film stars Siddharth, Tamannaah, Prakash Raj, Ramya Krishna, and Nassar while Brahmanandam and Venu Madhav play supporting roles. The film has score composed by Mani Sharma with the soundtrack by trio Shankar–Ehsaan–Loy.

The film was released on 5 February 2009. It has won three Nandi Awards and three CineMAA Awards, while Ramya Krishnan won the Filmfare Award for Best Supporting Actress – Telugu. It has been remade in Bengali as Romeo (2011).

Plot 
Geeta grows up in a village, under the shade of her doting father Subramanyam who takes care of everything for her and she is equally attached to him. She comes to Hyderabad for higher studies and stays at her uncle, (Gachibowli) Diwakar's house. There she meets with Siddharth "Siddhu" friend of her cousin. Eventually they grow close and fall in love.

Though Siddhu was a playful, carefree young chap, he has problems at his home as his parents are divorced. He reveals that to Geeta and tells her that he is coming to her village to meet his father. There he asks Geeta's hand in marriage but Subramanyam doesn't agree. He says that he couldn't marry his daughter to a person whose parents are divorced. He wants to give his daughter in a big family but at least he wants his parents to be together. Siddhu asks him whether he would agree to marriage if his parents reunite and Subramanyam agrees to that.

From then on start the efforts and trials of both Siddhu and Geetha to get Prakash and Rajyalakshmi together. One night, when Prakash is driving Siddhu to his mother's home, they talk about when his parents separated. His father understands his feelings and what he's trying to say, and his father answers "that he couldn't have done anything,his mother just left him." To this Siddhu answers, "No, you should have gone after her. You should have never let her go." Even after this talk with Prakash, Geeta and Siddhu often fail, but eventually Siddhu reunites his parents and Geeta's father, Subramanyam, also unites the other lovers, Geeta and Siddhu.

Cast 

 Siddharth as Siddharth "Siddhu" Verma
 Tamannaah as Geeta Subramanyam
 Prakash Raj as Prakash Verma
 Ramya Krishna as Rajyalakshmi
 Nassar as Subramanyam
 Brahmanandam as Gachibowli Diwakar, Geeta's uncle
 Venu Madhav as Bangarraju "Bangaram"
 Sudha as Geeta's mother
 Hema as Gachibowli Diwakar's wife
 Karuna as Swathi, Geeta's cousin
 Samrat Reddy as Subodh
 Ambati Srinivas as Diwakar's neighbour
 Surekha Vani
 Raghu Babu
 Raju Sundaram in a special appearance in the song "Evade Subramanyam"

Soundtrack 

The soundtrack features 8 songs composed by Bollywood composer trio Shankar–Ehsaan–Loy with lyrics written by Sirivennela Sitaramasastri, Chandrabose and Ramajogayya Sastry. The film marks the Telugu debut of the composers and their second non-Hindi soundtrack after the 2001 Tamil film Aalavandhan.

The album received overwhelmingly positive reviews from the critics. Bangalore Mirror review, said: "The intelligently localized sound in the trio’s Telugu debut does the trick". Sheetal Tiwari of Bollyspice, in her four star review, summed up: "Shankar-Ehsaan-Loy have a created a totally different sound for KIKK. Do not be surprised if Shankar-Ehsaan-Loy make a habit of directing Telugu musicals because they have without a doubt left their mark". Indiaglitz described the album as an "amalgamation of class, mass and western tunes".

Reception 
Radhika Rajamani of Rediff.com called the film a "perfect entertainer." Rajamani appreciate the characterization and performances and added, "credit should go to debutant director Kishore Kumar for penning a script which is entertaining yet meaningful." Idlebrain.com rated the film 3/5 and opined that the film's plus points are excellent songs and emotions in second half but the negative point is slow-paced narration.

Awards 
CineMAA Awards
CineMAA Award for Best Comedian – Brahmanandam
CineMAA Award for Best Debut Director – Kishore Kumar
57th Filmfare Awards South
Filmfare Award for Best Supporting Actress – Telugu – Ramya Krishnan
Nominated – Filmfare Award for Best Music Director – Telugu
Nominated – Filmfare Award for Best Film – Telugu

Nandi Awards
Nandi Award for Akkineni Award for best home-viewing feature film
Nandi Award for Best Female Comedian – Hema
Nandi Award for Best Screenplay Writer – Vikram Sirikonda & Deepak Raj

Mirchi Music Awards (Telugu)
Mirchi Music Awards Critic Awards (Album)
Mirchi Music Awards Critic Awards (Song) – "Anandama"

References

External links 
 

2009 films
2000s Telugu-language films
Telugu films remade in other languages
2009 directorial debut films